is a railway station located in Ibusuki, Kagoshima, Japan. The station opened in 1936. It is the southernmost conventional staffed railway station in Japan.

Lines 
Kyushu Railway Company
Ibusuki Makurazaki Line

JR

Adjacent stations

Nearby places
Yamakawa Port
Unagi Pond
Narikawa Post office

Railway stations in Kagoshima Prefecture
Railway stations in Japan opened in 1936
Ibusuki, Kagoshima